Lindale Park station is a METRORail light rail station in Houston, Texas. It serves the Red Line and opened as part of the Red Line Extension on December 21, 2013.

METRORail stations
Railway stations in the United States opened in 2013
Railway stations in Harris County, Texas